Zapala is a city and touristic destination in the Patagonian province of Neuquén, Argentina with about 32,000 inhabitants according to the .

The city is located at the geographic center of the province at the confluence of national and provincial roads, on a route to the Andes and Chile.  The city hosts a Loma Negra cement plant.

Zapala is near the Laguna Blanca National Park and a ski resort and is situated in a steppe region,  known as Pehuenia, which has small Araucaria forests and includes the nearby town of Aluminé and other towns.

History 

Zapala was founded on 12 July 1913, and turned into a municipality in 1948. It was (and still is) located around a railway station built by the Buenos Aires Great Southern Railway, a British-owned company taken over by the Ferrocarril General Roca after railway nationalisation in 1948  and, since railway privatisation in 1993, in the hands of Ferrosur Roca. The city is split in two by the railways; on one side there is a commercial district with old buildings, and on the other a modern residential area.

The station is a terminus at the end of the line from Bahía Blanca and Neuquén which was meant to continue across the Andes mountains into Chile. Construction was abandoned in the 1920s although resumption of construction was proposed in 2006.

In 1918 Zapala was the starting point of the first flight by an airplane across the Andes, when Luis Candelaria flew to Cunco, Chile, on April 13. It is served by Zapala Airport.

Geography

Climate
The climate of Zapala is cold semi-arid (BSk, according tho the Köppen climate classification), bordering on a cool-summer Mediterranean climate (Csb). Winters are cold. The climate is also very windy during most of the year; Winds of  have been registered. It may also snow an average of  every year.

See also 

 South Trans-Andean railway

References

External links
 
 Patagonia.com.ar - Portal of the Argentine Patagonia.

Populated places in Neuquén Province
Populated places established in 1913
1913 establishments in Argentina
Cities in Argentina
Argentina
Neuquén Province